The 1922 Ohio Green and White football team represented Ohio University as a member of the Ohio Athletic Conference (OAC) during the 1922 college football season. Led by third-year head coach Russ Finsterwald, the Green and White compiled an overall record of 5–3 with a mark of 3–1 in conference play.

Schedule

References

Ohio
Ohio Bobcats football seasons
Ohio Green and White football